The Cape hare (Lepus capensis), also called the brown hare and the desert hare, is a hare native to Africa and Arabia extending into India.

Taxonomy
The Cape hare was one of the many mammal species originally described by Carl Linnaeus in his landmark 1758 10th edition of Systema Naturae, where it was given the binomial name of Lepus capensis.

The taxon is part of a species complex. Lepus tolai and Lepus tibetanus were moved out based on geographic distribution and molecular characteristics. The current remaining grouping of Lepus capensis sensu lato remains paraphyletic.

Description
The Cape hare is a typical hare, with well-developed legs for leaping and running, and large eyes and ears to look for threats from its environment. Usually, a white ring surrounds the eye. It has a fine, soft coat which varies in colour from light brown to reddish to sandy grey. Unusually among mammals, the female is larger than the male, an example of sexual dimorphism.

Distribution and habitat
The Cape  hare inhabits macchia-type vegetation, grassland, bushveld, the Sahara Desert and semi-desert areas. It is also common in parts of the Ethiopian highlands, such as Degua Tembien.

Feeding

The Cape hare is a nocturnal herbivore, feeding on grass and various shrubs. Coprophagy, the consumption of an organism's own fecal material to double the amount of time food spends in the digestive tract, is a common behaviour amongst rabbits and hares. This habit allows the animal to extract the maximum nourishment from its diet, and microbes present in the pellets also provide nutrients.

Like other hares, they run fast. The only predator which is capable of outrunning them is the cheetah. All other predators are ambush and/or opportunistic hunters; examples of these are leopards, caracals, and black-backed jackals.

Breeding
After a 42-day-long pregnancy, the female gives birth to from one to three young, termed leverets, per litter and may have as many as 4 litters per year. A characteristic of hares which differentiates them from rabbits is that the young are born precocial; that is, the young are born with eyes open and are able to move about shortly after birth. The Cape hare is no exception in this regard.

Gallery

Taxonomy
Currently, 12 subspecies are recognised:
 Lepus capensis capensis
 Lepus capensis aquilo
 Lepus capensis carpi
 Lepus capensis granti
 Lepus capensis aegyptius
 Lepus capensis hawkeri
 Lepus capensis isabellinus
 Lepus capensis sinaiticus
 Lepus capensis arabicus
 Lepus capensis atlanticus
 Lepus capensis whitakeri
 Lepus capensis schlumbergi

References

Cape hare
Mammals of Africa
Mammals of Western Asia
Fauna of East Africa
Mammals of North Africa
Mammals of Southern Africa
Fauna of the Sahara
Fauna of Egypt
Fauna of Iran
Mammals of Pakistan
Mammals of the Arabian Peninsula
Cape hare
Cape hare